Delsjön consist of two coherent lakes, Stora Delsjön and Lilla Delsjön, located in eastern Gothenburg, in the Delsjöområdet nature reserve. They serve as a reservoir for the city, receiving water from the Göta River. At the shore of Stora Delsjön there is a popular beach.

Gallery

Gothenburg
Tourist attractions in Gothenburg
Lakes of Västra Götaland County